Rodolfo Lara Lagunas (born 9 January 1942) is a Mexican politician from the National Regeneration Movement. From 2009 to 2012 he served as Deputy of the LXI Legislature of the Mexican Congress representing Tabasco from the Party of the Democratic Revolution.

References

1942 births
Living people
Politicians from Michoacán
People from Morelia
Party of the Democratic Revolution politicians
21st-century Mexican politicians
Morena (political party) politicians
Deputies of the LXI Legislature of Mexico
Members of the Chamber of Deputies (Mexico) for Tabasco